Epermenia theimeri is a moth of the family Epermeniidae. It is found in Italy.

References

Moths described in 2001
Epermeniidae
Moths of Europe